Felipe Augusto Rodrigues Pires (born 18 April 1995) is a Brazilian professional footballer who plays as a forward for Super League Greece club Volos, on loan from Dnipro-1.

Club career
Pires made his European debut for Red Bull Salzburg on 19 February 2015 in a 1–2 away defeat to Villarreal in the last 32 first leg of the UEFA Europa League, replacing Massimo Bruno after 64 minutes. A week later in the second leg, he came on at half time for Takumi Minamino in a 1–3 defeat which eliminated his club. On 6 June, he scored the latter goal as Salzburg defeated Austria Vienna 2–0 in the Austrian Cup title to win the double.

On 25 August 2015, it was announced that Pires had signed with Hoffenheim for an undisclosed fee. The next day, he was loaned to FSV Frankfurt of the 2. Bundesliga.

On 24 June 2016, Pires was loaned to Austria Wien until the end of the season.

On 12 September 2020, Pires signed with Moreirense F.C.

Career statistics

Honours
Liefering
Austrian Football First League: 2014–15

Red Bull Salzburg
Austrian Football Bundesliga: 2014–15
Austrian Cup: 2014–15

References

Austria Wien holte Filipovic und Pires, Rapid verpflichtete Entrup‚ vienna.at, 24 June 2016

External links

FC Red Bull Salzburg profile

Living people
1995 births
Association football midfielders
Brazilian footballers
FC Liefering players
FC Red Bull Salzburg players
TSG 1899 Hoffenheim players
FSV Frankfurt players
HNK Rijeka players
Moreirense F.C. players
SC Dnipro-1 players
ADO Den Haag players
Esporte Clube Juventude players
2. Bundesliga players
Austrian Football Bundesliga players
2. Liga (Austria) players
Ukrainian Premier League players
Eredivisie players
Brazilian expatriate footballers
Expatriate footballers in Austria
Expatriate footballers in Germany
Expatriate footballers in Croatia
Expatriate footballers in Portugal
Expatriate footballers in Ukraine
Expatriate footballers in the Netherlands
Brazilian expatriate sportspeople in Austria
Brazilian expatriate sportspeople in Germany
Brazilian expatriate sportspeople in Croatia
Brazilian expatriate sportspeople in Portugal
Brazilian expatriate sportspeople in Ukraine
Brazilian expatriate sportspeople in the Netherlands
Footballers from São Paulo